Derek Nassari (born 20 October 1971) is an English former footballer who played as a striker. Nassari enjoyed one substitute appearance with Chester City in The Football League, when he replaced Sean Lundon in a 1–0 loss at Bury on 17 March 1990. He later made two appearances in the Conference for Northwich Victoria during 1992–93.

References

1971 births
Living people
Footballers from Salford
English Football League players
Association football midfielders
National League (English football) players
English footballers
Chester City F.C. players
Northwich Victoria F.C. players